Richard Brünner (born 1889, date of death unknown) was an Austrian fencer. He competed in the foil competitions at the 1924 and 1928 Summer Olympics.

References

External links
 

1889 births
Year of death missing
Austrian male fencers
Austrian foil fencers
Olympic fencers of Austria
Fencers at the 1924 Summer Olympics
Fencers at the 1928 Summer Olympics